Yuri Ivanovich Shikunov (Russian: Юрий Иванович Шикунов; 8 December 1939 – 15 March 2021) was a Soviet and Russian footballer and manager who played as a midfielder.

Honours

Club
 Soviet Top League runner-up: 1966

Country
 UEFA European Championship runner-up: 1964

Individual
 Included in list of the 33 best players of the USSR
 No. 2: 1960
 No. 3: 1961

Awards
 Master of Sports of the USSR: 1960
 Honoured Coach of the Russian SFSR: 1990

References

Soviet footballers
Soviet football managers
Russian football managers
Association football midfielders
FC Taganrog players
FC SKA Rostov-on-Don players
FC Rostov players
Soviet Top League players
FC SKA Rostov-on-Don managers
Sportspeople from Taganrog
1939 births
2021 deaths
1964 European Nations' Cup players